The Magic Fountain is a 1961 film starring Peter Nestler and Helmo Kindermann.

External links
 

1961 films
1960s fantasy films
1960s English-language films
American fantasy films
1960s American films